Bessie M Staples married name Bessie Shearlaw (c.1915-date of death unknown), was a female England badminton international.

Badminton career
Staples was a winner of the All England Open Badminton Championships. She won the mixed doubles in the 1939 All England Badminton Championships.

After marrying James Shearlaw in 1945 she competed in her married name and won the Irish Open, Scottish Open and the Scottish Individual Championships.

References

English female badminton players